Doug Dench (29 January 1930 – 19 August 2012) was an Australian rules footballer who played with Essendon in the Victorian Football League (VFL). He won a reserves premiership with Essendon in 1950 and was the reserves best and fairest player in 1954. Dench was cleared to Victorian Football Association side Williamstown in 1957, but did not end up playing a match for them.

Notes

External links 
		

Essendon Football Club past player profile

1930 births
2012 deaths
Australian rules footballers from Victoria (Australia)
Essendon Football Club players
Doutta Stars Football Club players
Redan Football Club players